Beardslee Castle is a three-storey castle in Little Falls, New York, USA, constructed in 1860 as a replica of an Irish castle, and currently used as a restaurant. The manor has been rebuilt twice, after having been burned down by fires in 1919 and 1989.

Beardslee Castle was the project of widowed Lavina (Pardee) Beardslee, began in her latter years around the late 1790s. Her son, Augustus Beardslee, is credited with the building of the Castle, though it was Lavina's grandson, Capt. Guy Roosevelt Beardslee (who was born in the mansion), that oversaw the completion of the project circa 1860. Capt. Beardslee undertook a business project obtaining electricity and a generator with a distribution system beginning a small local hydro-power plant. This small company succeeded into the Niagara Mohawk Power Corporation.

References

External links
Official Website
Beardslee Manor on CosmicSociety
Beardslee Castle on TripAdvisor

Restaurants in New York (state)
Houses in Herkimer County, New York
Castles in New York (state)